Sydoriv is a village located on the right bank of the Zbruch River in Chortkiv Raion (district) of Ternopil Oblast (province in western Ukraine). It belongs to Husiatyn settlement hromada, one of the hromadas of Ukraine. Sydoriv is known primarily as the location of the Sydoriv Castle.

Until 18 July 2020, Sydoriv belonged to Husiatyn Raion. The raion was abolished in July 2020 as part of the administrative reform of Ukraine, which reduced the number of raions of Ternopil Oblast to three. The area of Husiatyn Raion was merged into Chortkiv Raion.

References

Notes

Sources

External links 
 

Villages in Chortkiv Raion
Podolia Voivodeship
Kingdom of Galicia and Lodomeria
Tarnopol Voivodeship